Khilgana is a rural locality (an ulus) in Barguzinsky District, Republic of Buryatia, Russia. The population was 810 as of 2010. There are 8 streets.

Geography 
Khilgana is located 65 km northeast of Barguzin (the district's administrative centre) by road. Borogol is the nearest rural locality.

References 

Rural localities in Barguzinsky District